Panchrysia is a genus of moths of the family Noctuidae.

Species
 Panchrysia aurea (Hübner, 1803)
 Panchrysia dives Eversmann, 1844
 Panchrysia ornata Bremer, 1864
 Panchrysia tibetensis Chou & Lu, 1982
 Panchrysia v-argenteum Esper, 1794

References
 Natural History Museum Lepidoptera genus database
 Panchrysia at funet.fi

Plusiini